Echinogobius hayashii, the cheek-streaked goby, is a species of goby native to western Australia and Japan.  This species can be found at depths of from  living in areas with strong tidal currents and a sandy substrate.  This species grows to a length of  SL.  This species is the only known member of its genus. The specific name honours Masayoshi Hayashi, a curator at Yokosuka City Museum, who collected the type specimens.

References

External links
 Cheekstreak Goby @ ''fishesofaustralia.net.au

cheek-streaked goby
Monotypic fish genera
Fish of Japan
Marine fish of Western Australia
cheek-streaked goby